The 211th Division was created in July 1949 under the Regulation of the Redesignations of All Organizations and Units of the Army, issued by Central Military Commission on November 1, 1948,basing on the 309th Division of 127th Corps and 312th Division of 128th Corps, 19th Army Group of Republic of China Army defected in May 1949.

The division was part of 51st Corps. Under the flag of 211th division it took part in the Chinese Civil War. The division was disbanded in December 1951.

References

Infantry divisions of the People's Liberation Army
Military units and formations established in 1949
Military units and formations disestablished in 1951